Derek Smith (17 August 1931 – 19 August 2016) was a British jazz pianist.

Biography
Born in London, his father Sidney was an Inland Revenue employee. His mother, Lillian, made the decision that he was to take up piano lessons.  He was influenced by jazz pianist Art Tatum after listening to his recordings in the 1940s.

Smith played his first professional gig when he was fourteen. Someone rolled a piano out into the street, and he played for the VE Day celebrations in May, 1945. Over his parents' protestations, he joined John Dankworth's band when Cleo Laine was the female vocalist, and with many other British jazz musicians, including Kenny Graham and Kenny Baker. Smith also began performing and recording for the BBC, but soon realised the place for him professionally, was America.

Smith immigrated to the United States with no job awaiting him. Fourteen days after arriving in New York, he recorded with the Modern Jazz Quartet. One of his first engagements was working with his trio opposite Mel Tormé and Ella Fitzgerald at Basin Street East in New York. He joined Benny Goodman's band in 1961, and was pianist on Benny Goodman – The Swing Era, released by Time/Life Records, as well as working with Connie Kay and recording copiously as a session musician.

Derek Smith met Doc Severinsen when both were contracted to play a society gig. Later, when Severinsen was named leader of the NBC Orchestra, "The Tonight Show Band", he called Smith to be the pianist. Smith played with the band for seven years while continuing to record daily in New York studios and work with Benny Goodman. When The Tonight Show moved to the West Coast, Smith opted to stay in New York and continue his career as a "first call" studio musician.

Smith led his own band on NBC's Musical Chairs game show after he left The Tonight Show. After "Musical Chairs" was cancelled, he began concentrating on jazz concert performances while continuing to record. Smith's trio album, Love for Sale, was nominated for a Grammy Award on 1989. Smith has around 30 albums as leader to his credit in the United States and Japan. Described by critics as "fiery", "passionate", and having "an evil left hand", he was a frequent headliner at jazz festivals around the world.

Smith may be heard on recordings ranging from the popular Burt Bacharach/Dionne Warwick and Steve Lawrence/Eydie Gorme tracks, recorded in the 1960s, to jazz albums with Dizzy Gillespie, Buddy DeFranco, Louie Bellson, Milt Hinton, and Clark Terry. The material Smith has recorded also includes movie sound tracks among them Woody Allen's Hannah and Her Sisters (1986), Crimes and Misdemeanors (1989) and Martin Scorsese's The Age of Innocence; (1993).

The roster of singers with whom Derek Smith performed go from Frank Sinatra to Luciano Pavarotti, Placido Domingo and Robert Palmer (in the Royal Albert Hall). Lyricist Sammy Cahn, a good friend until his death, comedian Steve Allen, and many other performers have frequently called upon his accompanying and conducting skills.

He continued to work with Goodman in the 1970s, and recorded as a leader from 1978. He worked as a solo performer into the 2000s and also played in a trio with Bobby Rosengarden and Milt Hinton.

Smith died in New York in 2016 aged 85.

Discography

As leader
 Swingin' with Derek (Norma, 1961)
 Toasting (Time, 1962)
 Don't Let Go (1974)
 The Man I Love (Progressive, 1978)
 My Favorite Things (Progressive, 1978)
 Love for Sale (Progressive, 1978)
 Bluesette (Progressive, 1978)
 I'm Old Fashioned (Progressive, 1980)
 Derek Smith Trio Plays Jerome Kern (Progressive, 1980)
 Dark Eyes (Prestige, 1983)
 Derek Smith Plays the Passionate Piano (Special Music, 1987)
 Live Concert with Dick Hyman (Jass, 1992)
 The Trio – 1994 (Chiaroscuro, 1994)
 New Orleans Mardi Gras Explosion (Special Music, 1994)
 Dixieland Dance Party (Essex, 1995)
 Dick and Derek at the Movies with Dick Hyman (Arbors, 1998)
 High Energy (Arbors, 2002)
 Live in London (Harkit, 2004)
 Pan Montuno (Derek Smith, 2005)
 To Love Again (Venus, 2009)
 Beautiful Love (Venus, 2009)
 Constellation Jazz: Four Stars on a Brilliant Night at "Struggles" Jazz Club (Progressive, 2010)

As sideman
With Doc Severinsen
 1968 The Great Arrival 
 1970 Doc Severinsen's Closet

With Marlena Shaw
 1972 Marlena (Blue Note)
 1973 From the Depths of My Soul (Blue Note)

With Tony Mottola
 1973 Tony Mottola and the Quad Guitars 
 1974 Tony Mottola and the Brass Menagerie

With Linda Lewis
 1975 Not a Little Girl Anymore 
 1977 Woman Overboard

With Arnett Cobb
 1978 Arnett Cobb Is Back (Progressive)
 1980 Funky Butt (Progressive)

With Bill Watrous
 1975 The Tiger of San Pedro 
 1982 Roarin' Back into New York City
 2000 Live at the Blue Note

With Teresa Brewer
 1983 American Music Box, Vol. 1
 1983 I Dig Big Band Singers
 1984 Live at Carnegie Hall & Montreaux, Switzerland
 1989 What a Wonderful World
 1992 Memories of Louis

With Louie Bellson
 1986 Louis Bellson & His Jazz Orchestra 
 1990 Airmail Special: A Salute to the Big Band Masters
 1992 Peaceful Thunder
 1994 Live from New York

With Buddy DeFranco
 1990 Like Someone in Love 
 2007 Charlie Cat 2

With Flip Phillips
 1993 Live at the 1993 Floating Jazz Festival 
 1999 John & Joe Revisited 
 2003 Celebrates His 80th Birthday

With Milt Hinton
 1990 Old Man Time
 1994 Laughing at Life

With Benny Goodman
 1993 B. G. World Wide
 1997 Live Down Under 1973 with Zoot Sims

With Dick Meldonian
 1989  'S Wonderful
 1994 You've Changed

With others
 1958 Jazz Piano International, with Dick Katz, René Urtreger (Atlantic)
 1983 They Got Rhythm: Live, Dick Hyman
 1969 A Breath of Fresh Air, Marlene VerPlanck
 1971 Permissive Polyphonics, Enoch Light & the Light Brigade
 1975 Supernatural Thing, Ben E. King
 1977 Baritone Madness, Nick Brignola
 1978 Starfingers, Sal Salvador
 1980 Inflation, Stanley Turrentine
 1980 Pee Wee in New York, Pee Wee Erwin
 1983 June Night, Svend Asmussen
 1992 Ridin' High, Robert Palmer
 1994 Special Relationship, Jimmy Knepper/Joe Temperley/Bobby Wellins
 1995 For Your Ears Only, Bob Stewart
 1999 The John Lewis Piano/Jazz Piano International, John Lewis
 1999 Watching & Waiting, Gerry Mulligan
 2000 QuaDRUMvirate, Ronnie Bedford
 2001 I'll Never Forget You, Debra Holly
 2002 Plays Not Quite Two Dozen, Kenny Baker
 2002 Something Borrowed, Something Blue, Jerry Jerome
 2002 The Giants at Bob Haggart's 80th Birthday Party, Bob Haggart
 2003 As He Wanted to Be Remembered, Walt Levinsky
 2003 Smile/Tarrytown Tenor, Carmen Leggio
 2005 Tommy Newsom and His Octo-Pussycats, Tommy Newsom
 2006 Spread a Little Happiness, John Dankworth
 2007 Once More with Feeling, Phil Bodner

See also
The Green Bird (Elliot Goldenthal musical in which he performed.)

References

1931 births
2016 deaths
people from Stratford, London
English jazz pianists
Musicians from London
English session musicians
People educated at Ilford County High School
The Tonight Show Band members
Statesmen of Jazz members
Arbors Records artists
Chiaroscuro Records artists
Venus Records artists
Prestige Records artists